The first season of the Black Clover anime TV series was directed by Tatsuya Yoshihara and produced by Pierrot. The season adapts the first nine volumes (chapters 1–75) of Yūki Tabata's manga series of the same name, with the exception of episode 13 (which has a separate storyline from the manga) and episode 29 (recap). It follows the first adventures of Asta and the Black Bulls in the Clover Kingdom. After Asta receives a grimoire and joins the Black Bulls to become the new Wizard King, he explores a dungeon and meets Mars, a magic knight from the Diamond Kingdom. Shortly afterwards, Asta is captured during a zombie invasion of the capital by a group of rogue mages who are working for the Eye of the Midnight Sun squad (also known as the Midnight Sun). After Asta is rescued, he teams up with a fellow Black Bull and later on his captain to battle some child kidnappers. Later on, the Black Bulls travel to the Underwater Temple and meet a series of challenges to find a magic stone (which the Eyes is also searching for).

The season initially ran from October 3, 2017 to September 25, 2018 on TV Tokyo in Japan; Avex Pictures released it on DVD and Blu-ray in five compilations (each containing nine to 11 episodes) between February 23, 2018 and January 25, 2019. Crunchyroll and Funimation licensed the series for an English-language release, with Crunchyroll simulcasting the series worldwide and Funimation producing a North American Simuldub. Funimation's adaptation aired from December 2, 2017 through January 6, 2019 on Adult Swim's Toonami programming block, and they released the first DVD and Blu-ray compilations on August 7, 2018.

The first season has eight pieces of theme music: four opening and four closing themes. In episodes 14 to 27, the opening and closing themes are "PAiNT it BLACK" by BiSH and "Amazing Dreams" by SWANKY DANK. In episodes 28 to 39, the opening and closing themes are "Black Rover" by Vickeblanka and "Black to the dreamlight" by Empire. For the remainder of the season, the opening and closing themes are "Guess Who Is Back" by Koda Kumi and "Four" by Faky. Megumi Han sang "Four" as her character, Kahono, in episode 50.


Episode list

Home media release

Japanese
In Japan, Avex Pictures released the first season of the anime on DVD and Blu-ray in five "chapter" volumes. The first volume was released on February 23, 2018, and the fifth was released on January 29, 2019.

English
In North America, Crunchyroll & Funimation released the first season in five volumes. The first volume was released on August 7, 2018, and the fifth volume was released on July 2, 2019. The volumes are available in standard Blu-ray and DVD combination sets, and volumes three and five are also available in limited edition sets. In the United Kingdom and Ireland, Sony Pictures UK released the first volume in DVD and Blu-ray combination sets on August 20, 2018; Manga Entertainment is handling subsequent releases. In Australasia, Universal Sony released the first part of the series on DVD on August 15, 2018, and Madman Entertainment released the rest of the season, with part two released on April 3, 2019.

Notes

References

Black Clover episode lists
2017 Japanese television seasons
2018 Japanese television seasons